Public School No. 111-C is a historic rural school building located at Christiana, New Castle County, Delaware.  It was built in 1923, and consists of a one-story, balloon frame, gambrel-roofed main block containing the classrooms with three small wings housing the furnace room, wash rooms and work and lunch room. The building is in the Colonial Revival style. It is an example of the schools for African American children built in the 1920s by progressive philanthropist Pierre S. du Pont (1870–1954).

It was listed on the National Register of Historic Places in 1979.

References

School buildings on the National Register of Historic Places in Delaware
Colonial Revival architecture in Delaware
School buildings completed in 1923
Schools in New Castle County, Delaware
National Register of Historic Places in New Castle County, Delaware
1923 establishments in Delaware